Hesenê Metê (born 1957) is a prominent Kurdish writer, novelist and translator. He was born in Erxanî near Diyarbakır in south-eastern Turkey. He has been living in Sweden since the 1980s. He has translated works by Pushkin and Dostoyevski into Kurdish.

Works 
Merivên reben, Translation of Poor Folk by Dostoyevski, 185 pp., Welat Publishers, 1991. .
Smîrnoff, Story, 95 pp., Welat Publishers, Stockholm, 1991. .
Ardû, çîrokên gelêrî, 173 pp., Welat Publishers, Stockholm, 1991. .
Labîrenta cinan, Novel, 197 pp., Welat Publishers, Huddinge, Sweden, 1994. .
Epîlog, Story, 141 pp., Nûdem Publishers, Järfälla, Sweden, 1998. .
Keça Kapîtan, Translation of The Captain's Daughter by Pushkin, 1998.
Tofan, Story, 88 pp., Apec Publishers, Spånga, Sweden, 2000. .
Ansîklopediya Zarokan (Children's Encyclopaedia), with Amed Tigris, Mehmud Lewendi, Seyidxan Anter, Ali Ciftci, 236 pp., Apec Publishers, Sweden, 2004. .
Gotinên gunehkar, Novel, 151 pp., Avesta Publishers, Istanbul, Turkey, 2007. .
Li dêrê, novel, 102 pp., Nûdem Publishers, Istanbul, Turkey, 2011. .
Pêsîrên dayê, Story, 130 pp., Apec Publishers, Spånga, Sweden, 2013. .
Îşev û çîroka dawîn, Story, 90 pp., Peywend Publishers, Istanbul, Turkey, 2014. 
Hefsar, novel, 94 pp., Peywend Publishers, Istanbul, Turkey, 2018.

References 
Works of Hesenê Metê, Immigrant Institute(in Swedish). 

1957 births
Kurdish-language writers
Living people
Turkish Kurdish people
Turkish emigrants to Sweden